Ratu Sir Josefa Lalabalavu Vanayaliyali Sukuna  (22 April 1888 – 30 May 1958) was a Fijian chief, scholar, soldier, and statesman.  He is regarded as the forerunner of the post-independence leadership of Fiji.  He did more than anybody to lay the groundwork for self-government by fostering the development of modern institutions in Fiji, and although he died a dozen years before independence from the United Kingdom was achieved in 1970, his vision set the course that Fiji was to follow in the years to come.

Lineage 
Sukuna was born into a chiefly family on Bau, off the island of Viti Levu, the largest island in the Fiji archipelago.  His father, Ratu Joni Madraiwiwi, was the son of the Bauan noble and rebel leader Ratu Mara Kapaiwai.

After joining the Audit Office as a clerk at an early age, Ratu Madraiwiwi had steadily worked his way up through the civil service, establishing connections along the way that were later to prove decisive in the life of his son.  Ratu Sukuna's mother, Adi Litiana Maopa, was the sister of the Tui Nayau, Ratu Alifereti Finau Ulukalala (High Chief of Lau) and father of Ratu Tevita Uluilakeba III [The father of Ratu Sir Kamisese Mara]

Ratu Mara Kapaiwai of Bau was born in 1815, son of Ratu Vuibureta and Adi Mere Veisaca. Ratu Vuibureta was the sixth son of Ratu Banuve Baleivavalagi the 3rd Vunivalu of Bau from 1770 to 1803 and Adi Ufia from Lakeba.

Throughout his life, Ratu Sukuna was regarded as a credible contender for the title of Tui Viti.

Although he was not accorded a chiefly title from Bau his birthplace, he was installed as the second Tui Lau in 1938 following the traditional process of consultation between the Yavusa Vuanirewa and the endorsement of the Tui Nayau, Ratu Tevita Uluilakeba III following the passing of Ratu Alifereti Finau Ulukalala as referenced in the TRY Lakeba. He held the title of Tui Lau until his death in 1958.

Early life
Sukuna's exposure to diverse cultures came early.  Although Sukuna was an indigenous Fijian, his father enrolled him at the Wairuku Indian School in Ra, founded in 1898 by Pandit Badri Maharaj, who later served from 1917 to 1929 as the first Indo-Fijian member of Fiji's Legislative Council (the forerunner to the present Parliament.  One of the teachers at the school was the Rev. Charles Andrew.  Andrew was a colourful character, an Oxford-educated Anglican clergyman who had converted to Roman Catholicism and then back again, before sailing for the mission field in Fiji.  Determined that Sukuna should receive the best education possible, his father arranged for him to receive private tuition from Andrew.  He was a strict teacher, beating Sukuna on occasion.

Sukuna proved to be an exceptionally able student; author Deryck Scarr later said of him that he spoke English with "the bell-like tones of standard southern English, as though he had studied diction with the royal family" – a compliment rarely paid even to a native speaker, let alone one who knew English only as a second language.  Largely as a result of Andrew's influence, the young Ratu Sukuna was sent to the prestigious Wanganui Collegiate School in Wanganui, New Zealand.  He proved to be a bright pupil.  He was a strong debater, played rugby and cricket, and became the Wanganui Collegiate boxing champion.

Sukuna hoped to remain in New Zealand to pursue a university degree, but his source of funds dried up and he was forced to return to Fiji, where, in 1907, he joined the civil service as a fifth class clerk.  His superb command of English, however, ensured his rapid promotion and it was not long before he became the chief translator for the government.  In 1909 he was invited by his uncle, Ratu Alfred Finau Ulukalala, to return to the Lau Islands to become the assistant master of the Lau Provincial School at Lakeba.  He also became visiting examiner at Queen Victoria School and Levuka Public School, at the age of 21. At Lakeba, Sukuna formed what was to be another key relationship in his life, with the young English headmaster, Arthur Maurice Hocart.

War hero and Scholar 
It was at this point in his life that the connections cultivated by Sukuna's father throughout his career proved decisive.  No Fijians to date had graduated from a university, and the British colonial administration was unwilling to encourage higher learning for the natives.  However, Ratu Madraiwiwi was personally acquainted with the colonial Governor, Sir Francis Henry May, and in 1911 asked him to try to arrange for his son to study at a British university on the grounds that he had passed the matriculation exams at Wanganui Collegiate School.  May's influence persuaded the British Colonial Secretary, reluctantly, to grant Sukuna a one-year leave of absence from his responsibilities in Fiji to study history at Wadham College, Oxford, in 1913.  Financial constraints had prevented him from realising his dream of pursuing a four-year law degree at Cambridge.
[[File:Ratu.Keni.jpg|350px|thumb|right| Ratu Sukuna Tui Lau"" and other chieftains of Lau in Vanua Balavu, 1918 after service in France and Before he left again for England]]
Ratu Sukuna had little time to settle down to his studies.  World War I broke out and Sukuna applied for enlistment in the British Army.  The British government, however, had a policy of refusing enlistment to Fijians, a policy rationalised by a wish to avoid exploiting the native people.  Believing that Fijians would never gain the respect of their British rulers, without proving their worth on the battlefield, Sukuna enlisted in the French Foreign Legion instead.  He fought bravely and was wounded towards the end of 1915 and forced to return to Fiji. He returned to France the following year, however, with the Native Transport Detachment, a newly formed contingent assisting the British Army.  Apparently, the British colonial authorities had had a change of heart about native participation in the war.  For his wartime service, Ratu Sukuna was awarded the Croix de Guerre.

Now a war hero, Ratu Sukuna had no difficulty raising funds for his return to Oxford. Towards the end of 1918, he graduated from the history course that was shortened for returned servicemen.  He proceeded to the Middle Temple in London, and by 1921 had graduated with both a BA and an LL.B degree.  He thus became the first-ever Fijian to receive a university degree.

 The Statesman 
Meanwhile, Sukuna's father had died in 1920, and he had to return to Fiji to take his place as head of the mataqali, or clan. He brought with him a tailored isulu, a skirt worn by men, which became Fiji's national dress.  He became a chief assistant in the Native Lands Commission in 1922, and a decade later he was stationed in Lomaloma, and also on the island of Lakeba in the Lau Islands, as a district and provincial commissioner.  The same year, he was appointed to the Legislative Council to represent the Fijian people.  (At that time, non-European members were appointed, rather than elected).  In this capacity, Sukuna attended the coronation of King George VI and Queen Elizabeth in London in 1937.

In 1938, Sukuna was installed as the Tui Lau (Protector of the Tongans of Sawana in Vanuabalavu), a senior chiefly title in the Lau Islands that had been vacant for many years.  In many respects, this formalised what had long been the reality that he was the most influential chief in Fiji, notwithstanding the seniority enjoyed by other chiefs.  Sukuna's education complemented his lineage: he was a descendant of Fijian and Lauan royalty, and no other chief held a university degree.  It was by hard work, however, that he earned the respect of his people.  Travelling from village to village, Sukuna listened to the common people and took their concerns back to the colonial authorities.  In 1940, he returned to Suva as the Native Lands Reserves Commissioner.' That year he was awarded the CBE.  In 1942 he set about recruiting Fijian men for the World War II effort.  The British government had completely reversed its former position of not permitting natives to enlist, and the Fijian Battalion, commanded by Ratu Edward Cakobau (a relative of Sukuna's) fought with distinction.  At long last, Fijians had begun to earn the respect of the British authorities, and after the war, they began steps towards fostering self-government in Fiji.

One of Ratu Sukuna's greatest achievements was his role in the establishment of the Native Land Trust Board.  Most of the land of Fiji was owned by the mataqali, or clans, but worked by Indo-Fijian farmers.  Prior to 1940, each clan individually negotiated the terms of leasing the land to those who farmed it, resulting in a wide variation of lease terms.  As most landholdings were small, few mataqali were able to develop their plots to any large degree.  The then colonial governor, Sir Arthur Gordon, proposed establishing a central body to hold the land in trust and lease it to willing farmers on terms that would be uniform throughout Fiji.  The pressing need of the time was to provide land for a growing population of Indo-Fijian farmers, without expropriating it from its Fijian owners, and to do so in a way that was consistent.  As early as 1933, Ratu Sukuna had recognised this problem, and had told the Great Council of Chiefs, "We regard the Indian desire for more permanent tenancy as a natural and legitimate consequence an agricultural community settling in any country. But how was this desire to be reconciled with the need to protect the interests of present and future Fijian landowners?"  The Native Land Trust Board scheme emerged as a solution.

Persuading the various mataqali to accept the scheme, however, was far from easy.  The landowners were being asked to surrender, forever, the control of their land, and entrust its administration to a central authority that would act in the national interest, as well as that of the owners.  Almost single-handedly, Ratu Sukuna set about explaining the proposal to every mataqali in Fiji.  Rather than rely on radio broadcasts or printed flyers, he determined to take the proposal in person to every village in the country.  After explaining it to the people, he would leave to allow the idea to percolate and would return later to answer more questions.  If necessary, he would return again and again, gradually building a consensus in favour of the plan.  Finally, after a long and vigorous debate, the Great Council of Chiefs approved the scheme in what Sir Philip Mitchell, the then Governor, described as "one of the greatest acts of faith and trust in colonial history."  Ratu Sukuna himself was assigned the task of examining each landholding and deciding what portion should be reserved for the present and future needs of the mataqali, and what portion should be made available for leasing.

Meanwhile, Sukuna had become Secretary for Fijian Affairs.  In 1944, he reestablished the Native Regulations Board, later renamed the Fijian Affairs Board. Then in 1950, he was appointed as an advisor to the British delegation to the Fourth Committee at Lake Success.  He said that while self-government was indeed the goal in the South Pacific, it would have to be of a kind that the local people could understand and work with.

Sukuna was created a Commander of the Most Excellent Order of the British Empire in 1939 and awarded a knighthood in 1946, in recognition of his services to Fiji. After receiving a second knighthood KCMG in 1953, Ratu Sukuna was appointed the first native-born Speaker (politics) of the Legislative Council in 1954.  Although it was only partially elected and had few of the powers of the modern Parliament of Fiji, the Legislative Council provided a venue for Fiji's future leaders to gain experience in the workings of government.   In 1956, Ratu Sukuna encouraged the formation of Fiji's first political party, the Fijian Association under the leadership of Ratu Edward Cakobau.

 Ratu Sukuna's Legacy 
Ratu Sir Lala Sukuna was married twice, first to Adi Maraia Vosawale (1903–1956) in 1928, and later to Maca Likutabua (1934–2000) in September 1957, eight months before his death.  Neither marriage produced any children, and his successor as the Tui Lau was his nephew, Ratu Sir Kamisese Mara. The late Adi Alani Sovanatabua (later Dimuri, when she married Ratu Kinivilame Pai Dimuri, of Naseakula, Macuata) was the only child and daughter of Ratu Sir Lala Sukuna as a result of a defacto relationship with Roko Melaia Lutukivuya, daughter of Roko Jone Liwaki, the brother of Ratu Alifereti Finau Ulukalala. Ratu Sukuna had acknowledged Adi Sovanatabua as his daughter. Roko Melaia Lutukivuya was the first cousin of Ratu Tevita Uluilakeba III and Aunt of Ratu Sir Kamisese Mara. 

Ratu Sukuna died en route to England on the ship , on 30 May 1958.  He was buried at the Vatanitawake, the Sau Tabu in Tubou, Lakeba alongside great leaders of Lau.

Although he did not live to see Fiji gain its independence (in 1970), the role he played in the pre-independence years was crucial; without him, there might not have been a Fijian state or its creation would almost certainly have been delayed.  Not only was his personal role decisive, he also mentored several of the men who were to play pivotal roles in the post-independence years.  His nephew, Ratu Sir Kamisese Mara, became a world figure as Fiji's first Prime Minister and later served as President; Ratu Sir Edward Cakobau served for many years as a Cabinet minister and his cousin, Ratu Sir George Cakobau became the country's de facto Head of State as its first native-born Governor-General; and Ratu Sir Penaia Ganilau became the first President of the Republic of Fiji.  All four had been personally selected by Ratu Sukuna for leadership, mentored by him, and educated abroad at his expense. Upon his passing Ratu Sukuna had nothing more to his name but 50 cents which was concluded that in a sense, he gave everything he had to his nation and investing in the education of his successors.  Long after his death, they continued to regard him as their mentor and saw the implementation of his vision as their sacred responsibility.  Even today, now that the torch has been passed to a younger generation, most Fijian politicians, even from the Indo-Fijian community, regard themselves as heirs of his legacy.

Fiji's third constitutional President, Ratu Josefa Iloilo, described Ratu Sukuna as "a great and noble man ... whose foresight and vision still impacts on our future."

Regnal Title

Footnotes

 References 
 
 
  – a journal type entry written by Ratu Sukuna and edited into a book by Deryk Scarr''

External links 
 Native Lands Trust Board information on Ratu Sir Lala Sukuna.

1888 births
1958 deaths
Fijian chiefs
Fijian soldiers
Knights Commander of the Order of St Michael and St George
Knights Commander of the Order of the British Empire
Tui Lau
People educated at Whanganui Collegiate School
Soldiers of the French Foreign Legion
I-Taukei Fijian members of the Legislative Council of Fiji
Alumni of Wadham College, Oxford
Speakers of the Legislative Council of Fiji
Politicians from Lakeba
Politicians from Bau (island)
Members of the Middle Temple
20th-century Fijian lawyers